Dmitri Vladimirovich Parmuzin (born 11 October 1979 in Volgograd) is a Russian football coach and a former player. He manages an amateur side FC VGAFK Volgograd.

References

1979 births
Sportspeople from Volgograd
Living people
Russian footballers
FC Rotor Volgograd players
Russian Premier League players
FC Lada-Tolyatti players
FC KAMAZ Naberezhnye Chelny players
FC Olimpia Volgograd players
FC Elista players
Russian football managers
Association football defenders